Landtag elections in the Free People's State of Württemberg (Freie Volksstaat Württemberg) during the Weimar Republic were held on five occasions between 1919 and 1932. Results with regard to the percentage of the vote won and the number of seats allocated to each party are presented in the table below. The table is an important indicator of the swings in political opinion in this part of Germany between the second and third Reichs, a period when parliamentary democracy came to have real political meaning in Germany. On 31 March 1933, the sitting Landtag was dissolved by the Nazi-controlled central government and reconstituted to reflect the distribution of seats in the national Reichstag. The Landtag subsequently was formally abolished as a result of the "Law on the Reconstruction of the Reich" of 30 January 1934 which replaced the German federal system with a unitary state. Württemberg is now a part of the modern land (federal state) of Baden-Württemberg.

See also
 Württemberg
 History of Württemberg
 Weimar Republic
 March 1933 German federal election

Notes

Elections in the Weimar Republic
Elections in Baden-Württemberg
History of Württemberg
Wurttemberg
Wurttemberg
Wurttemberg
Wurttemberg
Wurttemberg